Since the inception of the football one-group Norwegian top-flight league competition, Eliteserien, in 1963, a number of players have scored three goals (a hat-trick) or more in a single match.

Sigurd Rushfeldt has scored three or more goals eleven times in Eliteserien, more than any other player. Petter Belsvik has scored ten; Stig Johansen and Bengt Sæternes have scored seven hat-tricks each. Belsvik (HamKam, Molde, Rosenborg, Stabæk and Start) is the only player to have scored hat-tricks for five different clubs. Five players have scored hat-tricks and still ended up on the losing side: Jostein Flo, Steffen Iversen, Björn Bergmann Sigurðarson, Bengt Sæternes and Anthony Ujah.

Two players have scored a double hat-trick (6 goals) in a match; Odd Iversen and Jan Fuglset. Kenneth Nysæther, Harald Martin Brattbakk and Thorstein Helstad have scored five goals in a match. Erik Karlsen holds the record for the quickest Norwegian top division hat-trick, netting three times for Lillestrøm against Mjøndalen in 2 minutes 30 seconds.

The 1996 season holds the record for the most hat-tricks in a season, with twenty.

Hat-tricks
This list show all players who have scored three goals or more in a single match from the start of the 1989 season and onwards.

This list is under construction.

Note: The results column shows the home team score first

Multiple hat-tricks
The following table lists the minimum number of hat-tricks scored by players who have scored two or more hat-tricks.

Players in bold  are still active in the Eliteserien.

References

Hat-tricks
Hat-tricks
Eliteserien
Association football player non-biographical articles